Hardisty may refer to:

Hardisty (surname)
Hardisty, Alberta, a town in Canada
Hardisty, an area in Edmonton, Alberta, Canada; usually defined as encompassing the neighbourhoods of Fulton Place, Capilano, Forest Heights, Gold Bar, and Terrace Heights

See also
Mount Hardisty, Jasper National Park, Canada